Fukuoka Citizens Gymnasium is an arena in Fukuoka, Fukuoka, Japan. It is the home arena of the Rizing Zephyr Fukuoka of the B.League, Japan's professional basketball league.

Facilities
 No. 1 gymnasium - 36m×49m
 No. 2 gymnasium - 21m×33m
 Swimming pool - 25m×7courses

Location map

References

Basketball venues in Japan
Buildings and structures in Fukuoka
Indoor arenas in Japan
Rizing Zephyr Fukuoka
Sports venues in Fukuoka Prefecture
Swimming venues in Japan
Sports venues completed in 1972
1972 establishments in Japan